Riace is a comune (municipality) in the Metropolitan City of Reggio Calabria in the Italian region Calabria, located about  south of Catanzaro and about  northeast of Reggio Calabria. Riace borders the municipalities of Camini and Stignano.

Art
It is notable as the place where the Bronzi di Riace (Riace bronzes), bronze statues of warriors, were found in the sea in 1972. These Ancient Greek sculptures can be seen in the Museo Nazionale della Magna Grecia (National Museum of Magna Graecia, i.e. the colonies of Greater Greece) in Reggio Calabria.

Migration policy
Riace attracted international attention through its policies on migrants under mayor Domenico Lucano during the European migrant crisis. As of January 2011, about 450 refugees from 20 countries had settled there among the 1,800 inhabitants, revitalising the village and preventing the closure of the village school. Lucano, came second runner-up in the 2010 World Mayor competition; the winner was the Mayor of Mexico City, which has about nine million inhabitants.  He was also listed by Fortune as one of the world's greatest leaders in 2016 featuring at number 40 in the magazine's listing.

Lucano was later sentenced to 13 years in prison for abetting illegal immigration.

References

See also 
Vallata dello Stilaro Allaro
Ghost town repopulation

Cities and towns in Calabria
Vallata dello Stilaro